Julio Andrés Gutiérrez Cassou (born August 18, 1983, in Montevideo) is a Uruguayan retired footballer who played as a defensive midfielder.

Teams
  River Plate 2001-2007
  Rentistas 2007-2008
  River Plate 2009
  Rentistas 2009-2010
  El Tanque Sisley 2010-2011
  B.I.T. 2011
  Cerro Largo FC 2012
  Wuhan Zall 2012
  Defensor Sporting 2013
  Rampla Juniors 2013
  B.I.T. 2014-2015
  Qingdao Hainiu 2015

Notes

References
 
 

1983 births
Living people
Uruguayan footballers
Club Atlético River Plate (Montevideo) players
C.A. Rentistas players
El Tanque Sisley players
Cerro Largo F.C. players
Wuhan F.C. players
Qingdao F.C. players
Defensor Sporting players
Rampla Juniors players
Uruguayan expatriate footballers
Expatriate footballers in China
Uruguayan expatriate sportspeople in China
China League One players
Association football midfielders